Samuel Thayer may refer to:

 Samuel R. Thayer (1837–1909), American attorney and diplomat
 Samuel J. F. Thayer (1842–1893), American architect
 Samuel Thayer (author), American author and wild plant forager